Pajarito Mesa is a census-designated place in Bernalillo County, New Mexico, United States. At the 2010 census, the population was 579. It is part of the Albuquerque Metropolitan Statistical Area.

Pajarito Mesa is an informal settlement lacking basic services including electricity, running water, and formal roads, and existing largely outside of government regulation. The mesa was first settled in the 1970s and the population had grown to about 250 families by 2013.

Geography

Demographics

Education
It is zoned to Albuquerque Public Schools.

References

Census-designated places in Bernalillo County, New Mexico
Census-designated places in New Mexico
Albuquerque metropolitan area